Pasmore may refer to:

John Pasmore, 16th-century English lawyer and Member of Parliament
Victor Pasmore (1908–1998), British artist
Wendy Pasmore (1915–2015), British artist, wife of Victor
Pasmore (novel), a 1972 novel by David Storey

See also 

 Passmore (disambiguation)